The 2018 Coupe des Comores is the 2018 edition of the Coupe des Comores, the knockout football competition of the Comoros.

Teams
Qualified teams for national stage:
Mwali:    Belle Lumière (Djoiezi)   
Ngazidja: US Zilimadjou (Moroni)
Ndzuani:  Ngazi (Mirontsi), Miracle (Bandrani)

Semifinals
[Sep 22, stade de Moroni]

US Zilimadjou             0-0 Miracle                   [5-6 pen]

[Sep 23, stade de Moroni]

Ngazi                     4-2 Belle Lumière

Final
[Sep 26]

Miracle                   3-3 Ngazi                     [4-3 pen]

See also
2018 Comoros Premier League

References

Comoros
Cup
Football competitions in the Comoros